Below are the squads for the 1986 FIFA World Cup final tournament in Mexico.

Group A

Argentina

Head coach:  Carlos Bilardo

Note that this squad is numbered alphabetically by surname, unlike traditional numbering systems where the goalkeeper has shirt number 1 and so forth. Exceptions were Daniel Passarella, Diego Maradona and Jorge Valdano, who were given their favoured #6, #10 and #11 shirts.

Bulgaria

Head coach:  Ivan Vutsov

Italy

Head coach: Enzo Bearzot

Note: with the exception of the goalkeepers, who were assigned the traditional shirt numbers for the role (1, 12 and 22) the Italian team was numbered alphabetically within their respective positions – Defenders (from 2 to 8), Midfielders (from 9 to 15), Wingers (16 and 17) and Forwards (from 18 to 21).

South Korea
Head coach: Kim Jung-nam

Group B

Belgium

Head coach: Guy Thys

Iraq

Head coach:  Evaristo de Macedo

Mexico

Head coach:  Bora Milutinović

Paraguay

Head coach: Cayetano Ré

Group C

Canada

Head coach:  Tony Waiters

France

Head coach: Henri Michel

Note that this squad is numbered alphabetically by surname within each positional group, and the goalkeepers are assigned the traditional French goalkeepers' shirts 1, 21 and 22 alphabetically.  Exceptions are Platini and Giresse who are given their favoured 10 and 12 shirts.

Hungary

Head coach: György Mezey

Soviet Union

Head coach: Valeriy Lobanovskyi

Group D

Algeria

Head coach: Rabah Saâdane

Brazil

Head coach: Telê Santana

Northern Ireland

Head coach: Billy Bingham

Spain

Head coach: Miguel Muñoz

Group E

Denmark

Head coach:  Sepp Piontek

Scotland

Head coach: Alex Ferguson

Uruguay

Head coach: Omar Borrás

West Germany

Head coach: Franz Beckenbauer

Group F

England

Head coach:  Bobby Robson

Morocco

Head coach:  José Faria

Poland

Head coach:  Antoni Piechniczek

Portugal

Head coach: José Torres

Notes
Each national team had to submit a squad of 22 players. All the teams included 3 goalkeepers, except Bulgaria and South Korea who only called two.

External links
1986 FIFA World Cup Mexico Teams FIFA website
Planet World Cup website
 weltfussball.de 

FIFA World Cup squads
Squads